Bawa Mulla Khan was a Dawoodi Bohra saint who lived in the 18th century in India. He died on the 29th of Shawwal. His shrine (dargah) is in Rampura, Madhya Pradesh, India.

Mulla Khan visited the court of 35th Da'i al-Mutlaq, Abduttayyeb Zakiuddin II, in Ahmedabad and presented  his son Syedi Abd al-Qadir Hakimuddin in Khumus (one fifth of earning to be presented in the name of god as Mulla Khan had five sons) up on the Dai's request. Abdeali Saifuddin, son of Abduttayyeb Zakiuddin II, took the responsibility of his education.

Mulla Khan's son Abd al-Qadir Hakimuddin (1665-1730 AD) had a distinguished career in the service of Da'i al-Mutlaq over the years. He is buried in Burhanpur, India.

Mulla Khan's family links with Dawoodi Bohra Dais. Current Dai syedna Mufaddal Saifuddin is from his progeny. Family tree is placed below.

References

Dawoodi Bohras
18th-century Indian Muslims